Agriculture is the main part of Tanzania's economy. As of 2016, Tanzania had over 44 million hectares of arable land with only 33 percent of this amount in cultivation. Almost 70 percent of the poor population live in rural areas, and almost all of them are involved in the farming sector. Land is a vital asset in ensuring food security, and among the nine main food crops in Tanzania are maize, sorghum, millet, rice, wheat, beans, cassava, potatoes, and bananas. The agricultural industry makes a large contribution to the country's foreign exchange earnings, with more than US$1 billion in earnings from cash crop exports.

The 6 main cash crops are cashew nuts, coffee, cotton, sisal, tea and tobacco. At one point in its agricultural history, Tanzania was the largest producer of sisal in the world.

The agriculture sector faces various challenges and had been the governments top priority to develop to reduce poverty and increase productivity. Farming efficiently has been a challenge for many farmers, and lack of finances and farming education has caused many to remain subsistence farmers. Farm sizes remain very small with an average plot size being around 2.5 ha.

Challenges on the agriculture industry of Tanzania include climate change and the resulting droughts, floods, and agriculture temperature shocks and a lack of agricultural technology. These pose severe  challenges to the living standards of most of people involved in the agriculture industry in Tanzania and create huge increases in unemployment, hunger, malnutrition and starvation, and diseases rates.

Large declines in commodity prices, decreased export revenues, increased trade and budget deficits all amount to hindering the growth of the country's gross domestic product (GDP). The Agriculture Industry in Tanzania represents 32.4 percent of GDP of Tanzania.

Soil and topography

The Great Rift Valley runs north to south and contains most of the country's lakes. The country is home to the highest point in Africa, Mount Kilimanjaro, and the lowest point in the continent, Lake Tanganyika.

Soil types vary drastically throughout the country. There are six main types of soil types in the country as follows;

 Volcanic soils: predominantly in the northern highland regions.
 Sandy soils: predominantly in the coastal regions and used mainly for grazing.
 Granite/Gneiss soil: predominantly in the northern regions of Mwanza and Tabora.
 Red soils: predominantly in the central plateau, including the Dodoma Region.
 Ironstone soils: predominantly in the western regions like Kagera and Kigoma.
 Vertisol: called mbuga black soil, spread across most of the country.

In summary for the variety of soil types studies still do not indicate which type of soil suits best for farming of a cash crop or a food crop.

Production
Tanzania produced in 2018:

 5.9 million tons of maize;
 5 million tons of cassava (12th largest producer in the world);
 3.8 million tons of sweet potato (4th largest producer in the world, second only to China, Malawi and Nigeria);
 3.4 million tons of banana (10th largest producer in the world, 13th adding plantain production);
 3 million tons of rice;
 3 million tons of sugarcane;
 1.7 million tons of potato;
 1.2 million tons of beans (6th largest producer in the world);
 940 thousand tons of peanut (7th largest producer in the world);
 930 thousand tons of sunflower seed (12th largest producer in the world);
 808 thousand tons of sorghum;
 561 thousand tons of sesame seed (5th largest producer in the world, losing only to Sudan, Myanmar, India and Nigeria);
 546 thousand tons of coconut (11th largest producer in the world);
 454 thousand tons of mango (including mangosteen and guava);
 389 thousand tons of pineapple;
 373 thousand tons of orange;
 356 thousand tons of tomato;
 238 thousand tons of cotton;
 171 thousand tons of cashew nuts (6th largest producer in the world);

In addition to smaller productions of other agricultural products, like tobacco (107 thousand tons, 8th largest producer in the world), coffee (55 thousand tons), tea (36 thousand tons) and sisal (33 thousand tons).

Cash crops

Coffee production

Coffee is grown on a large scale on both estates and by smallholders that form co-operatives and involves over 400,000 farmers. Coffee has been grown in the country since the colonial times and is a major export crop, earning over 17 percent of the country's foreign exchange. Tanzania mainly grows the arabica type; however, small farms in the Kagera Region grow Robusta coffee. Tanzanian coffee is globally more commonly known as Kilimanjaro Coffee.

Sisal production

Sisal was brought to Tanzania from Mexico by the German East Africa Company in the late 19th century. Sisal is grown in the northern regions of the country, such as Tanga and Kilimanjaro. At the time of independence in 1961, Tanzania was the largest producer of sisal in the world. Sisal production continued to decline after the Ujamaa movement and the continued depreciation of world prices. In recent years, the government has tried to liberalize the sector to encourage growth and increase export revenues.

Cashew production

Cashew production in Tanzania began towards the end of the British trusteeship of Tanganyika in the 1950s. In 2012, Tanzania was the world's eighth largest producer of cashews  and the fourth largest in Africa. Poor regulation and lack of reliable payments to farmers has plagued production. Cashew mainly grows in the southern regions of the country such as Mtwara and Lindi, and more than 90 percent of the nuts are exported in raw form. The raw nuts are mainly exported to India for processing due to a very small processing capacity domestically. The lack of domestic processing firms has cost the country vital foreign revenue and thousands of jobs. The Government has been struggling to find potential investors to revive the cashew processing industry.

Food Crops

The 11 food crops grown in Tanzania are as below list;
 Bean
 Cassava
 Maize
 Millet
 Oil palm
 Potato
 Rice
 Sorghum
 Sugarcane
 Sunflower
 Wheat

Herbs, vegetables and spices in Tanzania

Herbs, vegetables and spices in Tanzania include in the list below;
 Cabbage
 Capsicum
 Carrot
 Clove
 Cinnamon
 Cucumber
 Garlic
 Mint
 Onion
 Pea
 Spinach

Fruits in Tanzania

Fruits in Tanzania include in the list below;
 Avocado
 Banana
 Coconut
 Clementine
 Guava
 Grape
 Jackfruit
 Lemon
 Lime
 Lychee
 Mangoe
 Orange
 Okra
 Passion fruit
 Papaya
 Pear
 Pineapple
 Tamarind
 Tomato
 Strawberry
 Watermelon

Statistics

Main crop production

The ten non-cash crop production from 2013 as reported by the Food and Agriculture Organization of the United Nations as below table:

See also
 Ministry of Agriculture, Food Security and Cooperatives
 Tanzania Mercantile Exchange

References

External links